Oireachtas may refer to:

Oireachtas, the modern legislature of the Republic of Ireland
Oireachtas Report, a highlights package broadcast on RTÉ One
Oireachtas (Irish Free State), the historical legislature of the 1922–1937 Irish Free State
Oireachtas na Gaeilge, an important Irish cultural festival that celebrates the Irish-language arts, and traditional dance; more formally called "An tOireachtas"
Oireachtas (Irish dance), annual Irish dancing championship competition

See also
Families in the Oireachtas, list of Irish political families